Raise the Roof is a 1930 British musical film directed by Walter Summers and starring Betty Balfour, Maurice Evans, and Jack Raine. It was made at Elstree Studios.

The film's sets were designed by the art director John Mead.

Cast

References

Bibliography
 Low, Rachael. Filmmaking in 1930s Britain. George Allen & Unwin, 1985.
 Wood, Linda. British Films, 1927-1939. British Film Institute, 1986.

External links

1930 films
British musical films
1930 musical films
1930s English-language films
Films shot at British International Pictures Studios
Films directed by Walter Summers
British black-and-white films
1930s British films